Pasión de Gavilanes (international title: Hidden Passion) is a Colombian telenovela written by Julio Jiménez. It is produced by RTI Colombia in conjunction with the Telemundo network and with the participation of Caracol TV company. The telenovela is based on the 1994 telenovela Las aguas mansas, also written by Jiménez and produced by RTI. It premiered on Telemundo on 21 October 2003, while in Colombia it premiered on Caracol TV.

On May 12, 2021, Telemundo announced a second season through its upfront for the 2021-2022 television season, taking place 20 years after the events of the original series. Production of the season began on 18 October 2021. The season premiered on 14 February 2022, and ended on 31 May 2022.

Plot

Series overview

Season 1 
Bernardo Elizondo is the owner of a hacienda, where he lives with his wife, Doña Gabriela, their daughters: Norma, Jimena and Sara, Norma's husband: Fernando Escandón, and his father-in-law, Don Martín Acevedo, a retired military man who is paralyzed. Norma and Fernando's marriage was arranged by Doña Gabriela to hide that Norma had been the victim of a rape, but the marriage is in name only and has not been consummated, due to her trauma. Apart from that, Gabriela is in love with Fernando, so she forces her daughter to marry him to keep him close. Although Bernardo is in love with Libia Reyes, a humble young woman, he knows that he could not marry her, since Gabriela, a very despotic woman and very old-fashioned, would never give him a divorce. Bernardo is determined to break with everything in order to live out his love for Libia, and he decides to formally appear before the young woman's brothers; Juan, Óscar and Franco Reyes, who did not support the relationship but approve it, since the happiness of their sister depends on it. Unfortunately, Bernardo has a horse accident and dies. At the same time, Libia discovers that she is pregnant and finds out that Bernardo has died, so she decides to go to the Elizondo to claim the money, although she is scared and not convinced if she should go. When she arrives at the Elizondo house, Doña Gabriela humiliates and despises her family. Libia flees desperate and commits suicide by jumping off a bridge.

When the Reyes brothers find out everything, they swear to avenge the death of their sister and go to the Elizondo estate, posing as some bricklayers that Doña Gabriela has contracted to build a cabin for Norma and Fernando. This is achieved thanks to the Elizondo housekeeper, Eva Rodríguez, who also wants revenge on Gabriela for having forced her to give up her only daughter, Ruth, for having kept her single and having no resources to support her. By meeting the Elizondo sisters, Óscar Reyes intends to convince his brothers to change their revenge plans and seduce the Elizondo sisters, to pay them with the same price, although what he really intends is to get the Elizondo money to improve their situation. His brother Juan does not agree with their plans, but when he meets Norma Elizondo he changes his mind because they are instantly attracted to each other. This attraction makes Juan completely forget his revenge plans, but the couple will find many obstacles in the way that they must overcome.

Season 2 
Taking place 20 years after the first season, the Reyes and Elizondo family will face new challenges that threaten their family. The death of a teacher shakes the family as evidence points to one of the sons of one of the couples as the possible culprit, triggering a series of heartbreaking events that will, once again, put their love and loyalty to the test.

Cast

Main cast
 Danna García as Norma Elizondo Acevedo de Reyes; Bernardo and Gabriela's second daughter, Jimena’s older sister and Sara's younger sister, Juan's wife and Juan David, Leon and Erick's mother and Oscar, Franco and Libia's sister-in-law
 Mario Cimarro as Juan "Juancho" Reyes Guerrero, Oscar, Franco's and Libia's older brother, Ruth's maternal cousin, Norma's second husband and Juan David, Leon and Erick's father and Jimena's and Sara's brother-in-law
 Paola Rey as Jimena Elizondo Acevedo de Reyes; Bernardo and Gabriela's youngest daughter, Norma and Sara's younger sister and Oscar's wife Duván's stepmother, maternal aunt of Juan David, Leon, Erick, Gaby and Andres, Franco, Juan and Libia's sister-in-law
 Alfonso Baptista as Óscar Reyes Guerrero; Juan's younger brother, Franco and Libia's older brother, Ruth's maternal cousin and Jimena's husband Duván's father, Sara's and Norma's brother-in-law, and uncle of Juan David, Leon, Erick, Andres and Gaby
 Michel Brown as Franco Reyes Guerrero; Juan and Oscar's younger brother, Libia's older brother, Ruth's maternal cousin, Rosario's ex-lover, Eduvina's ex-husband and now Sara's husband, Andres and Gaby's father, Jimena's and Norma's brother-in-law, Juan David, Leon and Erick's uncle
 Natasha Klauss as Sara "Sarita" Elizondo Acevedo de Reyes, Bernardo and Gabriela's eldest daughter, Norma and Jimena's older sister and Franco's wife, Andres and Gaby's mother, aunt Juan David, Leon and Erick, Juan, Oscar and Libia's sister-in-law 
 Jorge Cao (season 1) and Germán Quintero (season 2) as Martín Acevedo; Gabriela's father, Norma, Jimena and Sara's grandfather, and Juan David's great-grandfather
 Kristina Lilley as Gabriela Acevedo de Elizondo/Gabriela Acevedo Escándon; Martin's daughter, Bernardo's widow,  Norma, Jimena and Sara's mother, and Fernando's former second wife, Juan David, Leon, Erick, Gaby and Andres Reyes grandmother, Oscar's, Franco's and Juan's mother-in-law 
 Ana Lucía Domínguez as Libia Reyes Guerrero / Ruth Uribe Santos / Ruth Guerrero Rodríguez (season 1; the same actress who played two different characters). Libia is Juan, Oscar, and Franco's younger sister, and Bernardo's former lover, aunt of Juan David, Leon, Erick, Andres and Gaby. Ruth is Eva's long-lost biological daughter and the Reyes siblings' maternal cousin as her dad is Aníbal Guerrero (The Reyes sibling's mom's brother)
 Gloria Gómez as Eva Rodríguez (season 1); Housekeeper of Elizondo household,  Norma, Jimena and Sara's nanny/mother-figure and Ruth's biological mother
 Zharick León as Rosario Montes; Franco's former lover, Armando's widow, Samuel's wife and Muriel's mother  
 Juan Sebastián Aragón as Armando Navarro (season 1); Rosario's husband
 Juan Pablo Shuk as Fernando Escandón (season 1); Norma and Gabriela's ex-husband
 Lorena Meritano as Dínora Rosales (season 1); was in love with Juan
 Bernardo Flores as Juan David Reyes (season 2), Juan and Norma's eldest son
 Camila Rojas as Muriel Caballero Montes (season 2), Rosario and Samuel's only daughter, Juan David's wife, Norma and Juan's daughter-in-law
 Juan Manuel Restrepo as León Reyes (season 2), Erick's twin and Juan David's younger brother. Juan and Norma's son
 Sebastián Osorio as Erick Reyes (season 2), León's twin and Juan David's younger brother. Juan and Norma's son
 Yare Santana as Gabriela "Gaby" Reyes (season 2), Sara and Franco's daughter, Andrés Reyes's sister
 Jerónimo Cantillo as Andrés Reyes (season 2), Sara and Franco's son, Gaby's brother
 Ángel de Miguel as Albin Duarte (season 2)
 Alejandro López as Demetrio Jurado (season 2)
 Boris Schoemann as Pablo Gunter (season 2), Rosario's employee
 Katherine Porto as Romina Clemente (season 2), had an affair with Oscar

Recurring cast
 Germán Rojas as Bernardo Elizondo (season 1); Gabriela's ex-husband, Libia's former lover,  Norma, Jimena and Sara's father, Juan David, Leon, Erick, Andres and Gaby's maternal grandfather
 Talú Quintero as Eduvina Trueba (season 1); Franco's ex wife 
 Valeria García as Juan David Reyes Elizondo (season 1); Norma and Juan's son
 Lady Noriega as María Josefa "Pepita" Ronderos
 Consuelo Luzardo as Melissa Santos (season 1)
 Julio del Mar as Leonidas Coronado (season 1)
 Andrés Felipe Martínez as Malcolm Ríos (season 1); works for Fernando
 Clemencia Guillén as Carmela Gordillo (season 1); works for Fernando 
 Sebastián Boscán as Leandro Santos (season 1); Ruth's adoptive cousin, Benito's brother and Jimena's gay friend
 Andrea Villareal as Panchita López (season 1)
 Alberto Marulanda as Miguel Barragán (season 1)
 Carlos Alberto Sánchez as Manolo Barragán (season 1)
 Inés Prieto as Hortencia Garrido de Barragán (season 1)
 Sigifredo Vega as Filemón Barragán (season 1)
 Carmenza González as Quintina Canosa
 Pedro Roda as Olegario (season 1)
 Fernando Corredor as Calixto Uribe (season 1); Ruth's adoptive father 
 Maria Margarita Giraldo as Raquel Santos de Uribe (season 1); Ruth's adoptive mother
 Giovanni Suarez Forero as Benito Santos (season 1), Ruth's adoptive cousin 
 Vilma Vera as Magnolia Bracho (season 1)
 Samuel Hernández as Zacarías Rosales (season 1)
 Jacqueline Henríquez as Úrsula de Rosales (season 1)
 Leonelia González as Belinda Rosales (season 1)
 Ricardo Herrera as Antonio Coronado (season 1), Ruth's boyfriend
 Jaime Gutiérrez as Jaime Bustillo (season 1)
 Pilar Álvarez as Violeta Villas (season 1)
 Víctor Rodríguez as Memo Duque (season 1)
 Tatiana Jauregui as Dominga, Elizondo's maid
 Alexander Palacio as Rubinsky (season 1)
 Herbert King as Herzog (season 1)
 Margarita Durán as Ceci (season 1)
 Liliana Calderón as Nidia (season 1)
 Margarita Amado as Rosita (season 1)
 Guillermo Villa as the father Epifanio (season 1)
 Ana Soler as Emilce (season 1)
 Helga Díaz as Betina (season 1)
 Carlos Duplat as Agapito Cortéz (season 1)
 Constanza Hernández as Panchita López (season 2); Rosario's employee
 Jacobo Montalvo as Duván Clemente (season 2); Oscar and Romina's son, Jimena's stepson
 Jonathan Bedoya as Nino Barcha (season 2); Gaby's late boyfriend
 Sebastián Vega (season 2)
 Valeria Caicedo as Sibila (season 2); Erick's fiance
 Álvaro García (season 2)

Guest stars
 Sergio Goyri as Samuel Caballero (season 2); Rosario's husband, Muriel's father, Juan David's father-in-law

Awards and nominations

Adaptions

Philippine adaptation

In the 2nd quarter of 2015, ABS-CBN announced RTI Producciones (in partnership with Caracol Televisión) and Telemundo have given to permit to do a Pinoy version of the series known as Pasión de Amor starring Jake Cuenca, Arci Muñoz, Ejay Falcon, Ellen Adarna, Joseph Marco and Coleen Garcia. Pasión de Amor premiered on June 1, 2015 and ended on February 26, 2016 with a total of 194 episodes in 3 seasons.

Notes

References

External links
 

2003 telenovelas
2003 Colombian television series debuts
2022 Colombian television series endings
Colombian telenovelas
RTI Producciones telenovelas
Telemundo telenovelas
Colombian LGBT-related television shows
Spanish-language telenovelas
Caracol Televisión telenovelas
Television series reboots
Television shows set in Colombia